Skipper's Love (Swedish: Skepparkärlek) is a 1931 Swedish comedy film directed by Ivar Johansson and starring Weyler Hildebrand, Einar Fagstad and Aino Taube. It was shot at the Råsunda Studios in Stockholm. The film's sets were designed by the art director Arne Åkermark.

Cast
 Weyler Hildebrand as 	Oskar Julius Caesar Napoleon Karlsson
 Einar Fagstad as 	Harald Jensen
 Thyra Leijman-Uppström as 	Mrs. Lundbom 
 Aino Taube as 	Majken Lundblom
 Sigurd Wallén as 	Norman
 Dagmar Ebbesen as 	Mrs. Norman
 Bengt Djurberg as 	Erik Jerker Norman
 Ragnar Widestedt as Borell
 Gösta Bodin as 	Drunk guest at Cosmopolite
 Tor Borong as Guest at 'Ankaret' 
 Ernst Brunman as 	Police Lt. Svensson
 Lena Cederström as Guest at Cosmopolite 
 Kotti Chave as Guest at Cosmopolite 
  Ruth Stevens as 	Guest at Cosmopolite 
 Sigge Fürst as 	Police constable 
 Mona Geijer-Falkner as	Guest at 'Ankaret'

References

Bibliography 
 Qvist, Per Olov & von Bagh, Peter. Guide to the Cinema of Sweden and Finland. Greenwood Publishing Group, 2000.

External links 
 

1931 films
Swedish comedy films
1931 comedy films
1930s Swedish-language films
Films directed by Ivar Johansson
Swedish black-and-white films
1930s Swedish films